The following list indicates ridings represented by Canadian prime ministers during their term(s) of office. Some prime ministers represented more than one constituency during their term(s), hence the tallied numbers exceed the number of prime ministers. Moreover, one prime minister—Sir Mackenzie Bowell—served his term while a member of the Senate, although he had previously been a member of the House of Commons from Ontario.

Three provinces—New Brunswick, Newfoundland and Labrador, and Prince Edward Island—have never been represented by a sitting prime minister. Mackenzie King briefly represented the Prince Edward Island riding of Prince, and Jean Chrétien even more briefly represented the New Brunswick riding of Beauséjour prior to their assuming the premiership, however. None of the three territories has been represented by a person who served as Prime Minister.

Two ridings have been represented by two sitting prime ministers. Both King and John Diefenbaker served Prince Albert; and both Wilfrid Laurier and Louis St. Laurent represented Quebec East. R. B. Bennett represented Calgary West during his premiership, as did Stephen Harper prior to his. Similarly, John A. Macdonald served his fourth term as MP for Carleton, a riding represented by Robert Borden as Opposition Leader in the 10th Parliament.

Ridings represented by future or former prime ministers
Prior to, or following, their tenure of office as Prime Minister, the following individuals represented other ridings:
Richard Bedford Bennett: Calgary, AB
Sir Robert Borden: Carleton, ON
Sir Mackenzie Bowell: Hastings North, ON
Jean Chrétien: Saint-Maurice—Laflèche, QC; Beauséjour, NB
Joe Clark: Rocky Mountain, AB; Kings—Hants, NS; Calgary Centre, AB
John Diefenbaker: Lake Centre, SK
Stephen Harper: Calgary West, AB; Calgary Heritage, AB
W.L. Mackenzie King: Waterloo North, ON; Prince, PE
Sir Wilfrid Laurier: Drummond—Arthabaska, QC
Alexander Mackenzie: York East, ON
Arthur Meighen: Grenville, ON
Brian Mulroney: Central Nova, NS
Sir Charles Tupper: Cumberland, NS; Cape Breton, NS
John Turner: St. Lawrence—St. George, QC; Ottawa-Carleton, ON; Vancouver Quadra, BC

References

Constituency